James Lowes is a former professional rugby league footballer, and coach. He played for Hunslet and Leeds, but arguably his best years were spent with the Bradford Bulls, where he won many trophies. He played there from 1996 to 2003.

Club career
Lowes began his career at Hunslet, moving to Leeds in 1992, before joining Bradford for the inaugural Super League season. Lowes was the 1997 Bradford Bulls season's top try scorer, and won the Man of Steel Award as the Bradford Bulls claimed their first Super League championship. In the 1997 post-season Lowes was selected to play for Great Britain at hooker in all three matches against Australia in the Super League Test series, scoring a try in the opening game.

As Super League VI champions, the Bradford Bulls played against 2001 NRL Premiers, the Newcastle Knights in the 2002 World Club Challenge. Lowes played at hooker in Bradford's victory.
Lowes played for the Bradford Bulls at hooker and scored a try in their 2003 Super League Grand Final victory against the Wigan Warriors, which was his last match before retirement.

Lowes' legacy was acknowledged when he was included in Bradford's 'Millennium Masters', 'Bull Masters', and in August 2007 was named in the club's 'Team of the Century'. Only six players have been included in all three lists; Lowes, Karl Fairbank, Trevor Foster, Keith Mumby, Robbie Paul and Ernest Ward.

Coaching career
Lowes began a coaching career following his retirement as a player, joining Salford City Reds as an assistant coach in 2004. Whilst on the coaching staff at Salford he made one appearance in a friendly match against Swinton, scoring a try.

Lowes later moved to Warrington Wolves as an assistant coach, and was named head coach following the departure of Paul Cullen in the 2008 season. However, after a disappointing opening to the 2009 season Lowes left the club and was replaced by Tony Smith. He later joined Leeds Rhinos as an assistant to Brian McDermott.

In 2013 Lowes was named as head coach at Leeds Carnegie.

In June 2014 Lowes was named as head coach at Bradford Bulls. After the disappointment and shock of being relegated out of Super League XIX after being one of the most successful Super League teams among the years, Lowes made his team one game away from returning to the Super League in 2016. They only required to now win a 'Million Pound Game' and final qualifier which determined if either Wakefield would remain in the Super League again next season or whether Bradford would return to the top flight again. However Bradford would suffer a 24-16 defeat which would cause Lowes' men to unfortunately remain in the Championship for the 2016 rugby league season. Lowes after the match caused a stir, after he took the match seriously and was tempted to quit rugby league.

In August 2015, Lowes became McNamara's new assistant as he took up the assistant coach role of the England national team.

References

External links
James Lowes at warringtonwolves.org
(archived by web.archive.org) The Millennium Masters - Forwards
(archived by web.archive.org) Bull Masters - James Lowes
(archived by web.archive.org) Team Of The Century
James Lowes named Head Coach
(archived by web.archive.org) James Lowes - Hall-of-Fame at hunsletrlfc.com

1969 births
Living people
Bradford Bulls coaches
Bradford Bulls players
English people of Irish descent
English rugby league coaches
English rugby league players
English rugby union coaches
Great Britain national rugby league team players
Hunslet R.L.F.C. players
Ireland national rugby league team players
Leeds Tykes coaches
Leeds Rhinos coaches
Leeds Rhinos players
Rugby league hookers
Warrington Wolves coaches
Yorkshire rugby league team players